|}

The Metal Man Chase is a Grade 3 National Hunt steeplechase in Ireland which is open to horses aged five years or older. It is run at Tramore Racecourse  over a distance of about 2 miles and 5½ furlongs (2 miles 5 furlongs and 100 yards or 4,316 metres). The race is scheduled to take place each year on New Year's Day and is currently run as the Savills New Year's Day Chase.

The race was previously known as the WIlf Dooly Chase, and had Listed status.  It was awarded Grade 3 status in 2020.

Records
Most successful horse (4 wins):
 Al Boum Photo - 2019, 2020, 2021, 2022

Leading jockey (5 wins):

 Paul Townend - Marito (2014), Bachasson (2018), Al Boum Photo (2020, 2021,2022)

Leading trainer  (8 wins):
 Willie Mullins -  Barker (2011), Apt Approach (2012), Marito (2014), Bachasson (2018), Al Boum Photo (2019, 2020, 2021,2022) ''

Winners

See also
 Horse racing in Ireland
 List of Irish National Hunt races

References

Racing Post: 

Tramore Racecourse
National Hunt chases
National Hunt races in Ireland